Monument to the first-grader (Russian: Памятник первокласснику) is a bronze monument which is located in the courtyard of the gymnasium № 36 on Gorky Street, 115 in the Leninsky district of Rostov-on-Don.

History 
The initiative to create the monument belongs to the head of the Leninsky district of Rostov-on-Don Sergey Suhariev. In his interview, he noted that at the initial stages of the development of the project, he wanted the final sculpture to resemble something of the Kid's character from the story of "Baby and Carlson, who lives on the roof".

The city authorities decided to hold a competition among pupils of grades 7-9 to create a better sketch of the monument. In total, dozens of sketches were presented.

The winner of the contest was Anna Nikolaeva - a student of 9 "B" class of gymnasium № 36. Money for the creation of the monument was provided by sponsors and Dmitry Lyndin was selected as a sculptor.

He created a sculpture on the pencil sketch of the student. It took about six months to create the monument, it was cast in one of the workshops of Rostov-on-Don. The solemn ceremony of opening the monument took place on September 1, 2011 on the Knowledge Day in the courtyard of the gymnasium № 36, at the opening ceremony of the monument was attended by Mayor Mikhail Chernyshev.

Description 
The monument is made of bronze, its height is about 2 meters, weight is half a ton. The monument depicts a laughing first-grader boy dressed in school uniform. He sits on the globe and holds a book in his hands. According to the sculptor this monument combines the features of a real first-grader who equally enthusiastically knows how to learn and have fun.

References 

Tourist attractions in Rostov-on-Don
Monuments and memorials in Rostov-on-Don